Bartolucci is an Italian surname. Notable people with the surname include:

Domenico Bartolucci (1917–2013), Italian Cardinal and director of Sistine Chapel choir
Rick Bartolucci (born 1943), Canadian politician
Marcello Bartolucci (born 1944), Italian Roman Catholic titular archbishop
Octavio Bartolucci (born 1975), Argentine rugby union player
Giovanni Bartolucci (born 1984), Italian footballer

Spelling Variations
Bartaloni, Bartoloni, Bartolone, Bartolacci, Bartolaccini, Bartalena, Bartolena, Bartalesi, Bartocci, Bartozzi, Bortuzzi, Bortuzzo, Bortoli, Bortolo, Bortol, Bortul, Bortoletti, Bortoletto, Bortolini, Bortolino, Bortolin and many more.

See also
33480 Bartolucci, a main-belt asteroid

Italian-language surnames
Patronymic surnames
Surnames from given names